The Napier Culverin was a licensed built version of the Junkers Jumo 204 six-cylinder vertically opposed liquid-cooled diesel aircraft engine built by D. Napier & Son. The name is derived from the French word, culverin, for an early cannon or musket. First flown in 1938, the engine went into limited production, with testing carried out on a Blackburn Iris V biplane flying-boat aircraft and Fairey IIIF biplane.

Design
The six cylinders were arranged vertically. Two crankshafts were located at the top and bottom of the engine and coupled together by gears. The inlet and exhaust ports were controlled by the pistons, as in a petrol-fuelled two-stroke engine.

Specifications (Culverin)

See also

Comparable engines
 Junkers Jumo 205

Related lists
 List of aircraft engines

References

Notes

Bibliography

 Lumsden, Alec. British Piston Engines and their Aircraft. Marlborough, Wiltshire: Airlife Publishing, 2003. .

External links
Photo of a Napier Culverin at Napierheritage.org

Culverin
Two-stroke diesel engines
Aircraft diesel engines
Opposed piston engines
1930s aircraft piston engines
Diesel engines by model
Diesel engines by maker